Make Me an Egghead is a British quiz show on BBC Two presented by Jeremy Vine. It was a spin-off from Eggheads with the goal to find two further Eggheads, one male and one female, to complement the existing team of seven. It ran from 22 August to 23 September 2016 and was won by Steve Cooke and Beth Webster. A similar show, Are You an Egghead?, aired in 2008 and 2009.

Background
After CJ de Mooi left Eggheads for an acting career in Cape Town, South Africa, the BBC announced that it would be airing a televised search for two replacement Eggheads, one male, one female. The show aired adjacently to Debatable: the former at 6 pm, Make Me an Egghead at 6:30 pm. Both were commissioned for twenty half-hour episodes and five 45-minute episodes, and both were broadcast for the first time on the same day, 22 August 2016.

Format
The heats were played in five rounds. The first three rounds focused on one of nine subject categories (out of Politics, Arts & Books, Food & Drink, History, Geography, Science, Music, Film & Television and Sport). Both players were asked in turn three triple-choice questions, and the player with the most correct answers won the round. If there was no winner, the round entered sudden death where alternative answers were not given. The winner selects any of the five Eggheads that have not yet been chosen and three head start points for the quickfire round if they win the general knowledge round. The fourth round is a variant of the first three, and is a general knowledge round with the challenger able to consult each Egghead they have won, although only once. The winner of this round is the winner of the contest and starts with three points for each of the first three rounds won. They then compete in the fifth round, a quickfire round for two minutes with a point for each correct answer. The leading four male and female contenders advance to the semi-final stage.

Results
The contestant in bold won and contested the quickfire round, while the contestant in normal fonts was eliminated.

Men's leaderboard

Women's leaderboard

In the event of a tie, the leader was the contestant who answered their last correct answer earliest in the quickfire round.

Semi-finals
The format was the same as that used previously on Are You an Egghead?, with the two contestants playing five head-to-head rounds and then a final round to decide the winner. The prize for winning a head-to-head round is to choose one of the Eggheads to help in the final round.

In the five preliminary rounds, the contestants are given a category, with the player who came higher on the leader board after the first round choosing whether or not to go first in the opening round. They are asked three multiple choice questions each; if these result in a tie, non-multiple choice questions are asked in pairs, in a sudden death fashion. The winner then gets to choose an Egghead and whether to go first or second in the next round.

After the preliminary rounds the final round takes place, in which the contestants are asked five General Knowledge multiple choice questions each. Sudden death again determines the winner should the scores be level after the first five questions. The contestants can call on the help of the Eggheads they have won in the head to head rounds should they wish. An individual Egghead can only be used once, although more than one Egghead can be used for a particular question.

Results

Final
In the final there were two head-to-head rounds with each contestant choosing the category for one of the two rounds. The winner of each round earned a three-point head start for the final round. The final general knowledge round was played up to ten, the contestants starting with the points gained in the two head-to-head rounds. The questions in the final round were not multiple-choice.

Results

The number given in brackets was the head start score after the head-to-head rounds.

Steve Cooke, the winning man, is a member of Mensa who previously won £12,900 on The People Versus in 2001.

Beth Webster, the winning woman, holds a record for the most appearances by a woman on the BBC's Mastermind. She is active on the Quizzing Grand Prix Circuit in the United Kingdom, and in The Quiz League of London. She and the Women's runner-up, Julia Hobbs, were both ranked as "Sages" in the 2012 Order of Merit listings of the British Quiz Association.

References

External links
 
 Make Me an Egghead at 12-Yard Productions

2010s British game shows
2016 British television series debuts
2016 British television series endings
BBC television game shows
English-language television shows
Television series by ITV Studios